This article is a summary of the major literary events and publications of 1720.

Events
September–October – The "South Sea Bubble", i.e. the collapse of the South Sea Company in England, affects the fortunes of many writers, including John Gay. It features in several works of literature. There are suspicions of complicity by Robert Walpole's government.
December 29 – The Haymarket Theatre in London opens with a performance of La Fille à la Morte, ou le Badeaut de Paris.
unknown date
Jonathan Swift begins major composition work on Gulliver's Travels in Ireland.
18-year-old London apprentice printer John Matthews is hanged for treason for producing the anonymous Jacobite pamphlet Vox Populi Vox Dei, the last time a British printer suffers execution for his work.

New books

Prose
Thomas Boston – Human Nature in its Fourfold State
Jane Brereton – An expostulatory Epistle to Sir Richard Steele upon the Death of Mr. Addison
Thomas Brown – The Remains of Mr. Thomas Brown
Josiah Burchett – A Complete History of the Most Remarkable Transactions at Sea
William Rufus Chetwood – The Voyages, Dangerous Adventures, and Miraculous Escapes of Capt. Richard Falconer
Samuel Croxall – The Fair Circassian
Daniel Defoe
Captain Singleton
Memoirs of a Cavalier
Serious Reflections During the Life and Surprising Adventures of Robinson Crusoe: With his Vision of the Angelick World
Charles Gildon – All for the Better (fiction)
Thomas Hearne – A Collection of Curious Discourses
Aaron Hill – The Creation
Edward Hyde, 1st Earl of Clarendon – The History of the Rebellion and Civil Wars in Ireland
Hildebrand Jacob – The Curious Maid
Madame de La Fayette – Histoire d'Henriette d'Angleterre
Delarivière Manley – The Power of Love (novels)
Alexander Pennecuik – Streams From Hellicon
Alexander Pope – The Iliad of Homer v, vi
Richard Rawlinson – The English Topographer
Martha Sansom – The Epistles of Clio and Strephon
George Sewell – A New Collection of Original Poems
Richard Steele
The Crisis of Property
A Nation a Family
Jonathan Swift – A Proposal for the Universal Use of Irish Manufacture
William Temple – The Works of Sir William Temple
Simon Tyssot de Patot – La Vie, les Aventures et le Voyage de Groenland du Révérend Père Cordelier Pierre de Mésange
Ned Ward – The Delights of the Bottle

Drama
Matthew Concanen – Wexford Wells
Benjamin Griffin – Whig and Tory
John Gay – Dione
John Hughes – The Siege of Damascus
John Leigh – Hob's Wedding
Pierre de Marivaux
L'Amour et la vérité
Arlequin poli par l'amour
Charles Molloy – The Half-Pay Officers
John Mottley – The Imperial Captives
 Charles Shadwell – Irish Hospitality

Poetry

John Gay – Poems on Several Occasions
A New Miscellany of Original Poems (anthology)
Matthew Prior – The Conversation
Allan Ramsay
A Poem on the South-Sea
Poems

Births
January 8 – James Merrick, English poet and scholar (died 1769)
January 13 – Richard Hurd, English writer and bishop (died 1808)
January 27 (baptized) – Samuel Foote, English actor and playwright (died 1777)
July 18 – Gilbert White, English naturalist (died 1793)
October 2 – Elizabeth Montagu, English scholar and bluestocking (died 1800)
October 17 – Jacques Cazotte, French romance writer (died 1792)
October 19 – John Woolman, American Quaker diarist and preacher (died 1772)
November 28 – Madeleine de Puisieux, French philosopher and feminist writer (died 1798)
December 13 – Carlo Gozzi, Italian playwright (died 1806)

Deaths
February 17 – John Hughes, English poet, editor and translator (born C. 1678)
April 21 – Antoine Hamilton Irish writer in French (born 1646)
June 27 – Guillaume Amfrye de Chaulieu, French poet and wit (born 1639)
August 5 – Anne Finch, Countess of Winchilsea, English poet (born 1661)
August 9 – Simon Ockley, English orientalist (born 1678)
August 17 – Anne Dacier (Madame Dacier), French scholar and translator (born c. 1654)
September 1 – Eusèbe Renaudot, French theologian and orientalist (born 1646)
September 9 – Philippe de Dangeau, French author and army officer (born 1638)
unknown date – Shalom Shabazi, Jewish Yemeni rabbi and poet (born 1619)

References

 
Years of the 18th century in literature